Thomas McCue (23 September 1913 – 19 April 1994) was an English professional rugby league footballer who played in the 1930s and 1940s.

Background
Tommy McCue was born in Widnes, Lancashire (birth registered in Prescot, Lancashire), and he died aged 80 in Cornwall, Ontario, Canada.

Playing career

International honours
Tommy McCue won caps for England while at Widnes in 1935 against France, and Wales, in 1936 against France, in 1937 against France, in 1938 against Wales (2 matches), and France, in 1940 against Wales, in 1945 against Wales, in 1946 against France, and Wales, and won caps for Great Britain while at Widnes in 1936 against Australia, in 1937 against Australia, and in 1946 against Australia (3 matches), and New Zealand.

County honours
Tommy McCue played  in Lancashire's 7-5 victory over Australia in the 1937–38 Kangaroo tour of Great Britain and France match at Wilderspool Stadium, Warrington on Wednesday 29 September 1937, in front of a crowd of 16,250.

Challenge Cup Final appearances
Tommy McCue played  in Widnes' 5-11 defeat by Hunslet in the 1933–34 Challenge Cup Final during the 1933–34 season at Wembley Stadium, London on Saturday 5 May 1934, played  in the 18-5 victory over Keighley in the 1936–37 Challenge Cup Final during the 1936–37 season at Wembley Stadium, London on Saturday 8 May 1937, and played  in Halifax's 2-9 defeat by Leeds in the 1940–41 Challenge Cup Final during the 1940–41 season at Odsal, Bradford, in front of a crowd of 28,500.

County Cup Final appearances
Tommy McCue played  in Widnes' 4-5 defeat by Swinton in the 1939–40 Lancashire County Cup Final first-leg during the 1939–40 season at Naughton Park, Widnes on Saturday 20 April 1940, and played  in the 11-16 defeat (15-21 aggregate defeat) by Swinton in the 1939–40 Lancashire County Cup Final second-leg during the 1939–40 season at Station Road, Swinton on Saturday 27 April 1940, and played , and was captain in Widnes' 7-3 victory over Wigan in the 1945–46 Lancashire County Cup Final during the 1945–46 season at Wilderspool Stadium, Warrington on Saturday 27 October 1945.

Club career
Tommy McCue made his début for Warrington on Saturday 23 November 1940, this was as a World War II guest, and this was his only appearance for Warrington.

Honoured at Widnes
Tommy McCue is a Widnes Hall Of Fame Inductee.

References

External links
Statistics at rugby.widnes.tv
Hall Of Fame at rugby.widnes.tv
Hall Of Fame at rugby.widnes.tv
Statistics at rugby.widnes.tv
Statistics at wolvesplayers.thisiswarrington.co.uk

1913 births
1994 deaths
Castleford Tigers players
England national rugby league team captains
England national rugby league team players
English rugby league players
Great Britain national rugby league team players
Halifax R.L.F.C. players
Lancashire rugby league team players
Oldham R.L.F.C. players
Rugby league halfbacks
Rugby league players from Widnes
Rugby League XIII players
Sportspeople from Cornwall, Ontario
St Helens R.F.C. players
Warrington Wolves players
Widnes Vikings players